Deep Blue: Chaos from Darkism  is an album by the band Balzac.

Track listing
"Death and Confrontation"
"Godless"
"The Scare"
"In Those Days"
"D.A.R.K."
"Horrorock"
"Ziggy Stardust"
"The Gaze"
"rain"
"[Untitled]"
"Deep Blue"
"Japanese Chaos"
"XXXxxx"
"[Untitled]"
"Japanese Trash"
"I Can't Stand It Anymore"
"Alone"
"D.A.R.K. [Demo Non Digital Ver.][*]"
"Came out of the Grave [Alternate Ver.][#][*]"
"Gyakusatsu-No Mukou-Gava [Demo Ver.][*]"
"I Can't Stand It Anymore [Demo Ver.][*]"
"Zetsubou-No Aro Basho-E [Alternate Ver.][#][*]"

DVD
"Balzac Live At The Liquid Room, April 3rd 2005 (Complete Concert)"
"Night the fiendish ghoul came out of the grave" (Redux Version)
"Fall 2005 USA Tour Documentarie"
"Shocker" promotional trailer
"Gimmie Some Truth" (Osaka, 2004)
"XXXxxx" (Yami Bandana Live, Tokyo 2004)
"In Those Days"
"D.A.R.K." (Deep Blue Ver.)
"Gyakusatsu-No Mukou-Gawa"
"Yami No Hikari e"
"Deep Blue"

Personnel 
 Hirosuke - vocals
 Atsushi - guitar
 Akio - bass guitar
 Takayuki - drums

Additional recording members 
 Nobusuke - chorus
 Miki - piano
 Ryan & Lana Moldenhauer - katari

External links
Official Balzac Japan site
Official Balzac USA site
Official Balzac Europe site

2007 albums
Balzac (band) albums